Glori Simmons is an American poet, and short story writer.

Simmons graduated from the University of Washington and from the University of Michigan with an MFA. She was a 2003 Stegner Fellow at Stanford University.

She is the author of Graft/Poems (Truman State University Press, 2001) and the recipient of the 2015 Spokane Prize for Short Fiction. Her work has appeared in Michigan Quarterly Review, Beloit Poetry Journal, Chelsea 79, Five Fingers Review and Quarterly West.

She is the director of the Thacher Gallery, University of San Francisco.

She lives in Oakland, California.

Awards
 2001 Alice Fay Di Castagnola Award co-winner
 2001 Chad Walsh Poetry Prize, by the Beloit Poetry Journal
 2004 Dana Award, for short fiction
 2005 Camargo Foundation Fellowship 
 2005 Chelsea Award, for short fiction
 2015 Spokane Prize, for short fiction (collection)
 2017 Autumn House Fiction Prize

Works
"Graft", Beloit Poetry Journal, Vol 51, Summer 2001 

 [anthology]

References

American women short story writers
American short story writers
University of Washington alumni
University of Michigan alumni
Stegner Fellows
University of San Francisco faculty
Living people
American women poets
1966 births
People from Oakland, California
Place of birth missing (living people)
American women academics
21st-century American women